Hayel Saeed An'am (1902 – 23 April 1990,  1323 – 27th of Ramadan, 1410 A.H.) was a Yemeni businessman and the founder of HSA Group (Hayel Saeed Anam Group), a conglomerate that has a revenue turnover as large as US$10 billion. His group is fully owned by his family and runs over 87 companies around the world spread across various geographies: Yemen, Saudi Arabia, UAE, Malaysia, Indonesia, Egypt, United Kingdom, Kenya, Nigeria, Algeria, Sudan, Ethiopia, and Djibouti. He retired from the executive role in the business in 1970 to fully run the social welfare foundation he founded.  He died on April 23, 1990 with an estimated net worth of $12 billion, of which 30% was pledged to the welfare foundation.

His Life
He was born in the village of Qaradh - Arouk - Hujaryyah - Taiz Governorate, Yemen. He was the third son of four sons. At the beginning of his life, he worked in sewing clothes and selling what he made. His mother died when he was in his early adolescence. He left his village, Qaradh, heading towards Aden city. He immigrated to France where he stayed for almost ten years. Then he returned to Aden to start his own business which was a small grocery store in the district of Mualla, Aden. The business grew extensively after he moved to Taiz forced out by the communist party that confiscated his entire business and assets in Aden. During the 1970s he opened the first private sector factory in the country followed by other foreign expansion to the GCC and U.K in the late 70's. The 80's witnessed the expansion to South East Asia which witnessed the group's venture into the palm oil industry.

Hayel Saeed was a very well respected man. Life as a philanthropist, he built schools, colleges, helped communities, lent money to the government of Yemen, & built 2,000 mosques.

When he died, he asked for his hand to be put outside the coffin as they transported him through the street to the graveyard. To show that as wealthy as he was, he did not take anything with him.

1902 births
1990 deaths
Yemeni businesspeople
Yemeni billionaires
20th-century businesspeople